This is a list of episodes for Traders a Canadian television drama series, which was broadcast on Global Television Network from 1996 to 2000.  The show was set in a Bay Street investment bank, Gardner Ross. Bruce Gray and Sonja Smits starred as the firm's senior partners, Adam Cunningham and Sally Ross. The cast also included Patrick McKenna, David Cubitt, Rick Roberts, Chris Leavins, Gabriel Hogan, David Hewlett, Peter Stebbings and Alex Carter.

References 

1999 Canadian television seasons
2000 Canadian television seasons